Srednja Vas pri Kamniku is settlement on the right bank of the Nevljica River at the Kamnik end of the Tuhinj Valley in the Upper Carniola region of Slovenia.

Name
The name of the settlement was changed from Srednja vas to Srednja vas pri Kamniku in 1955. In the past the German name was Mitterdorf.

References

External links

Srednja Vas pri Kamniku on Geopedia

Populated places in the Municipality of Kamnik